Christoph Strasser (born 4 November 1982 in Leoben, Austria) is an Austrian ultra cyclist who is a six-time winner and record holder for the fastest time in the Race Across America.

Career 
In his youth Strasser was quite active and enjoyed such sports as football. At the age of 18 his interests shifted and he began to ride a mountain bike. In 2002 he took part in his first 24-hour cycling event. In 2005, at the age of 22, he became the youngest person to enter and complete the Race Across the Alps. In the following years he won several more 24-hour races and in 2007 he set a new Austrian record in 24-hour cycling events by riding  and at the age of 25 became the youngest Ultra World Champion. In 2009, on his first attempt, he qualified for the Race Across America but had to retire, when he was in 4th place, due to health problems after . 

On 24 June 2011, Strasser became the third Austrian after Franz Spilauer and Wolfgang Fasching to win the Race Across America. 

Strasser again won the Race Across America in 2013, finishing the race in 7 days, 22 hours, 11 minutes, at an average speed of  — a new race record. This was the fastest crossing of the USA by an individual.

On 21 March 2015, Strasser set a new record for the most distance ridden on a road bike in 24 hours, riding  at the former Tempelhof Airport in Berlin.

In January 2017, Strasser became the first person to cross Australia from Perth to Sydney in under 7 days, covering 3,950 km (2,454.94 miles) in 6 days, 10 hours, 58 minutes.  He also broke the Australian 48 hour road record of 1,248.04 km, set in 1938 by Sir Hubert Opperman, with a distance of 1,374 km; also the Australian records for 72, 96, 120, 144, and 168 hours, and for 1,000 km and 1,000 miles. 

This feat gave Strasser the Guinness World Record for "Greatest distance cycled in 24 hours on an indoor track (WUCA) (male)".

On 22 June 2019, Strasser won his sixth Race Across America, finishing the rain-soaked race in 8 days, 6 hours and 51 minutes.

According to his team, he also broke 11 other world records, for Kilometer and Mile distances of 100, 200, 300, 500 and for six, 12, and 24 hours.

Personal life 
Strasser currently lives in Graz, Austria.

Achievements 
 2022 1st place - Transcontinental Race
 2019 1st place - Race Across America
 2018 1st place - Race Across America
 2017 1st place - Race Across America
 2014 1st place - Race Across America
 2013 1st place - Race Across America
 2012 2nd place - Race Across America
 2012 1st place - DOS-RAS Extreme
 2011 1st place - Race Across America
 2011 3rd place - DOS-RAS Extreme
 2010 1st place - Glocknerman - Ultra World Championship
 2009 2nd place - 24h Race Le Mans
 2007 1st place - Glocknerman - Ultra World Championship

References

External links 
 Official Homepage

Austrian male cyclists
1982 births
Living people
People from Leoben
Ultra-distance cyclists
Sportspeople from Styria